Volke is a surname. Notable people with the surname include:

Igor Volke (born 1950), Estonian ufologist and writer
Martin Volke (born 1982), Czech ice hockey player
Maximilian Volke (1915–1944), German World War II flying ace

German-language surnames